The IWI Dan is an Israeli bolt-action sniper rifle manufactured by Israel Weapons Industries (IWI). It is named after ancient city of Dan. The rifle is chambered for the powerful .338 Lapua Magnum cartridge and its main purpose is long-range sniping, and limited anti-material applications as well. The IWI DAN has sub-MOA accuracy at range of 1200 meters.

The rifle was designed by Dr. Nehemia Sirkis with cooperation of the Israel Defense Forces special forces and is manufactured by Israel Weapons Industries and marketed worldwide.

History
The DAN is unveiled at the 2014 Eurosatory convention.

References

External links

 IWI DAN 338 Bolt Action Sniper Rifle on IWI website

Bolt-action rifles
DAN
.338 Lapua Magnum rifles
Military equipment introduced in the 2010s